Queen of the Organ is a live album by American jazz organist Shirley Scott recorded in 1964 for the Impulse! label. The CD reissue added four additional performances from the same concert as bonus tracks.

Reception
The Allmusic review by Scott Yanow awarded the album 4½ stars stating "Overall, this is a pretty definitive live set... The musicians sound quite heated and consistently inspired. Highly recommended.

Track listing
All compositions by Shirley Scott except as indicated
 "Just In Time" (Betty Comden, Adolph Green, Jule Styne) - 7:34 
 "Squeeze Me (But Don't Tease Me)" (Duke Ellington, Lee Gaines) - 9:59 
 "Mean, Angry, Nasty and Lowdown" - 9:39 Bonus track on CD reissue 
 "Can't Buy Me Love" (John Lennon, Paul McCartney) - 9:11 Bonus track on CD reissue 
 "Like Blue" - 8:52 Bonus track on CD reissue 
 "Cute" (Neil Hefti) - 8:16 Bonus track on CD reissue 
 "Rapid Shave" (David Burns) - 8:28 
 "That's for Me" (Oscar Hammerstein II, Richard Rodgers) - 7:50 
 "The Theme" (Miles Davis) - 1:08
Recorded at the Front Room in Newark, New Jersey on December 5, 1964

Personnel
Shirley Scott — organ
Stanley Turrentine — tenor saxophone
Bob Cranshaw — bass
Otis Finch — drums

References

Impulse! Records live albums
Shirley Scott albums
1964 live albums
Albums produced by Bob Thiele